Jean de La Fontaine (1621–1695) was a French poet.

La Fontaine may also refer to:

Places
 La Fontaine Park, Montreal, Quebec
 Doué-la-Fontaine, a former commune in Maine-et-Loire, France
 La Fontaine-Saint-Martin, a commune in the Sarthe département, France
 La Fontaine, Indiana, United States

Other uses
 La Fontaine (surname)
 La Fontaine's Fables, the most popular work of the above

See also
 De la fontaine (disambiguation)
 Lafontaine (disambiguation)
 Lycée La Fontaine (disambiguation)
 Fountain (disambiguation)